Cleaning Up is a 1925 American comedy film directed by Fatty Arbuckle.

Cast
 Johnny Arthur
 George Davis

See also
 List of American films of 1925
 Fatty Arbuckle filmography

References

External links

1925 films
Films directed by Roscoe Arbuckle
American screwball comedy films
1920s screwball comedy films
1925 short films
American silent short films
American black-and-white films
American comedy short films
1925 comedy films
1920s American films
Silent American comedy films
1920s English-language films